The 1987–88 season was Arsenal's 69th consecutive season in the top flight of English football.

Season summary
After finishing fourth in the league and winning the Football League Cup a year earlier, they slipped to finish sixth this season. They did reach the League Cup final again, and took a 2–1 lead against Luton Town at Wembley before missing a penalty which would have given them a 3–1 lead, and ended up losing the game 3–2. Arsenal were quarter-finalists in the FA Cup.

In the league, Arsenal got off to a slow start, winning just one of their first five games, before going top of the table with a 10-match winning run. However, they then went into freefall, winning just one of their next 11 league games, and although their form improved during the final four months of the season, they could only manage a sixth-place finish. Young midfielders Michael Thomas and Paul Merson became regular members of the first team during this season, while defender Tony Adams, still only 21, succeeded Kenny Sansom as captain, on 6 March 1988 against Tottenham Hotspur at Highbury.

Arsenal had agreed an £850,000 deal for Leicester City striker Alan Smith two months before the end of the previous season, although he had remained on loan back at the East Midlands club until the end of the campaign. Smith finished as Arsenal's top scorer in his first season at the club, finding the net 16 times in all competitions.

A new signing at the start of the season was Nigel Winterburn, who arrived from Wimbledon to fill the right-back position left vacant by the sale of Viv Anderson to Manchester United. Thomas started the 1987/88 season at right back but his athleticism and passing ability soon brought a move to central midfield. From January 1988 Winterburn, the left-footed defender initially had to settle for the right-back role. Later signings at the club, were defender Lee Dixon in January 1988, who started in six matches as right-back, as well as winger Brian Marwood in March 1988, who started in four before the end of the season.

Arsenal were in a great run of form when they travelled to The Dell to face Southampton on 9 April 1988. Arsenal were unbeaten in eight league games and, even though they were missing Tony Adams and David O’Leary, Southampton won 4-2. All the talk was centred on Southampton’s new star, Alan Shearer who, at 17 years and 240 days, and broke Jimmy Greaves’ record of the youngest player to score a hat-trick in the English top flight. It had also been 21 years since a player had scored a hat-trick on his full debut in English football.

Squad

Top scorers

First Division
  Alan Smith 11
  Michael Thomas 9
  David Rocastle 7
  Perry Groves 6
  Paul Davis 5
  Paul Merson 5

Results

First Division

Football League Cup

FA Cup

Arsenal entered the FA Cup in the third round proper, in which they were drawn to face Millwall.

See also

 1987–88 in English football
 List of Arsenal F.C. seasons

References

Arsenal
Arsenal F.C. seasons